Frances Luella Welsing (née Cress; March 18, 1935 – January 2, 2016) was an American psychiatrist and well-known proponent of the Black supremacist melanin theory.  Her 1970 essay, The Cress Theory of Color-Confrontation and Racism (White Supremacy), offered her interpretation of what she described as the origins of white supremacy culture.

She was the author of The Isis Papers: The Keys to the Colors (1991).

Early life
Welsing was born Frances Luella Cress in Chicago on March 18, 1935. Her father, Henry N. Cress, was a physician, and her mother, Ida Mae Griffen, was a teacher. In 1957, she earned a B.S. degree at Antioch College and in 1962 received an M.D. at Howard University. In the 1960s, Welsing moved to Washington, D.C. and worked at many hospitals, especially children's hospitals. While Welsing was an assistant professor at Howard University she formulated her first body of work in 1969, The Cress Theory of Color-Confrontation and self-published it in 1970. The paper subsequently appeared in the May 1974 edition of The Black Scholar. This was an introduction to her thoughts that would be developed in The Isis Papers. Twenty-two years later she released The Isis Papers, a compilation of essays she had written about global and local race relations.

Career 
In 1992, Welsing published The Isis Papers: The Keys to the Colors. The book is a compilation of essays that she had written over 18 years.

The name "The Isis Papers" was inspired by an ancient Egyptian goddess. Isis was the sister/wife of the most significant god Osiris. According to Welsing, all the names of the gods were significant; however, also according to Welsing, Osiris means "lord of the perfect Black,” although there is no etymological validity to this assertion. Welsing specifically chose the name Isis for her admiration of "truth and justice" that allowed for justice to be stronger than gold and silver.

In this book she talks about the genocide of people of color globally, along with issues black people in the United States face. According to Welsing, the genocide of people of color is caused by white people's inability to produce melanin. The minority status of whites has caused what she calls a preoccupation with white genetic survival.

She believed that injustice caused by racism will end when "non-white people worldwide recognize, analyze, understand and discuss openly the genocidal dynamic." She also tackled issues such as drug use, murder, teen pregnancy, infant mortality, incarceration, and unemployment, in the black community. According to Welsing, the cause of these issues is white supremacy (the white man's race to the top). Black men are at the center of Welsing's discussion because, according to her, they "have the greatest potential to cause white genetic annihilation."

Views
In The Isis Papers, she described white people as the genetically defective descendants of recessive genetic mutants. She wrote that due to this "defective" mutation, they may have been forcibly expelled from Africa, among other possibilities. 
Racism, in the views of Welsing, is a conspiracy "to ensure white genetic survival". She attributed AIDS and addiction to crack cocaine and other substances to "chemical and biological warfare" by white people.

Welsing created a definition of racism, which is her theory of non-white genocide globally. She referred to racism and white supremacy synonymously. Her definition was "Racism (white supremacy) is the local and global power system dynamic, structured and maintained by those who classify themselves as white; whether consciously or subconsciously determined; this system consists of patterns of perception, logic, symbol formation, thought, speech, action and emotional response, as conducted simultaneously in all areas of people activity: economics, education, entertainment, labor, law, politics, religion, sex, and war. The ultimate purpose of the system is to ensure white genetic survival and to prevent white genetic annihilation on Earth --- a planet in which the overwhelming majority of people are classified as non-white (black, brown, red, and yellow) by white skinned people. All of the non-white people are genetically dominant (in terms of skin coloration) compared to the genetic recessive white skinned people". Welsing was against white supremacy and what she saw as the emasculation of black men.

Criticisms
Welsing caused controversy after she said that homosexuality among African-Americans was a ploy by white males to decrease the black population, arguing that the emasculation of the black man was a means to prevent the procreation of black people. She also believed that white homosexuality was effeminate and an attempt by weak men at gaining more masculinity. Welsing believed that homosexuality is one of the products of the white peoples' race toward supremacy (using their own weaknesses as a weapon). She theorized that white people were the first people with Albinism who were driven from Africa by the black natives.

Death
By December 30, 2015, Welsing had suffered two strokes and was placed in critical care at a Washington, D.C.-area hospital. She died on January 2, 2016, at the age of 80.

Film appearances
 Welsing appeared in the documentary 500 Years Later (2005), directed by Owen Alik Shahadah, and written by M. K. Asante.
 Welsing also appeared in Hidden Colors: The Untold History of People of Aboriginal, Moor, and African Descent, a 2011 documentary film by Tariq Nasheed.

Works

References

External links
 Ortiz de Montellano, B. (2001) Magic Melanin: Spreading Scientific Illiteracy to Minorities, csicop.org; accessed June 29, 2017.

1935 births
2016 deaths
20th-century American women writers
20th-century American writers
Afrocentrists
Antioch College alumni
Howard University alumni
People involved in scientific misconduct incidents
Pseudoscience
Writers from Chicago
Proponents of melanin theory
20th-century African-American writers
20th-century African-American women writers
21st-century American women